Benoît St-Amand (born 19 April 1978) is a Canadian ice sledge hockey player. He had a bone cancer in his right leg when he was 15 (1993), and his leg was amputated above the knee in 1995.

Born in Montreal, Quebec, St-Amand, began to play ice sledge hockey immediately after the 2002 Winter Paralympics, where he saw the Canadian national team, and made his debut for the national team just two years later (in 2004) - first as a forward, then as a goalie.

Honours
2010 Winter Paralympics
4th place
2009 IPC Ice Sledge Hockey World Championships
Bronze
2008 IPC Ice Sledge Hockey World Championships
Gold
2006 Winter Paralympics
Gold

External links
 
 
 
 
 

1978 births
Living people
Canadian sledge hockey players
Paralympic sledge hockey players of Canada
Paralympic gold medalists for Canada
Paralympic bronze medalists for Canada
Ice sledge hockey players at the 2006 Winter Paralympics
Ice sledge hockey players at the 2010 Winter Paralympics
Ice sledge hockey players at the 2014 Winter Paralympics
Medalists at the 2006 Winter Paralympics
Medalists at the 2014 Winter Paralympics
Sportspeople from Montreal
French Quebecers
Paralympic medalists in sledge hockey